Black & White is the eighth studio album by the Pointer Sisters, released in 1981 on the Planet label.

History
Black & White was their fourth record with producer Richard Perry and yielded the #2 pop hit "Slow Hand".  The fourth single release, "Should I Do It", reached #13 in the spring of 1982, making Black & White the first Pointer Sisters album to yield two Top Twenty hits.  Black & White was certified Gold in September 1981.  The album was remastered and issued on CD with bonus tracks in 2009 by Wounded Bird Records.

Record World said that the second single "What a Surprise" has "sing-song choruses and a simple yet effective melody line."

Track listing

Personnel 
The Pointer Sisters
 Anita Pointer – lead vocals (2, 4, 5-6), backing vocals, vocal arrangements
 June Pointer – lead vocals (1, 5, 7-9), backing vocals, vocal arrangements
 Ruth Pointer – lead vocals (3), backing vocals, vocal arrangements

Musicians
 James Newton Howard – keyboards (1), synthesizers (1, 3, 8)
 John Barnes – keyboards (2, 3, 6-8), electric piano (4), acoustic piano (9)
 Ed Walsh – synthesizers (2, 6, 7)
 William Smith – organ (4)
 Mike Cotten – synthesizers (5), synthesizer programming (5)
 David Foster – keyboards (5), arrangements (5)
 Greg Phillinganes – electric piano (9)
 Danny Faragher – organ (9)
 Paul Jackson Jr. – guitar (1-4, 6-9), guitar solo (8)
 Tim May – guitar (1-4, 6-9)
 Nathan Watts – bass (1-4, 6-9)
 Mike Porcaro – bass (5)
 John Robinson – drums 
 Paulinho da Costa – percussion (1-4, 6-9), congas (5)
 Trevor Lawrence – tenor sax solo (3, 6, 9)

Production 
 Richard Perry – producer
 Trevor Lawrence – associate producer
 David Foster – production assistance (track 5)
 Gabe Veltri – recording
 Piers Plaskitt – additional recording 
 Bill Schnee – remixing
 Tim Dennen – assistant engineer
 Stuart Furusho – assistant engineer
 Bobby Gerber – assistant engineer
 Larry Emerine – mastering
 Stephen Marcussen – mastering
 Precision Lacquer (Hollywood, California) – mastering location 
 Michael Barackman – music coordinator
 Susan Epstein – production coordinator
 Michael Solomon – production coordinator
 Kosh – art direction and design
 Aaron Rapoport – photography

Charts

References

External links
 

1981 albums
The Pointer Sisters albums
Albums produced by Richard Perry
Planet Records albums